Orcesis variegata is a species of beetle in the family Cerambycidae. It was described by Fisher in 1933.

References

Apomecynini
Beetles described in 1933